Aetheliparis rossi is a species of snailfish only known from the mesopelagic zone in the North Atlantic off Cape Hatteras, North Carolina.

Taxonomy
Aetheliparis rossi was first formally described as Psednos rossi in 2004 by Natalia Vladimirovna Chernova and David Leslie Stein with its type locality given as off Cape Hatteras in the western North Atlantic. In 2012 Stein described a new species from the southwestern Pacific Ocean, very similar to P. rossi, and he classified both species in the new genus Aetheliparis with P. rossi designated as its type species. The specific name honors Steve W. Ross of the University of North Carolina Center for Marine Science, who notified Chernova and Stein of the collection of this snailfish and provided the with specimens for study.

Description 
Aetheliparis rossi is an orange-pink fish around  SL with a very large mouth with a vertical opening. It has a straight spine.

References

Liparidae
Fish described in 2004